Euphrosyne Palaiologina can refer to one of several Byzantine women related to the imperial Palaiologos dynasty:

 Euphrosyne Palaiologina, illegitimate daughter of Emperor Michael VIII Palaiologos, wife of Nogai Khan
 Euphrosyne Palaiologina, originally named Jacobine, married a brother of Emperor Manuel II Palaiologos in 1403
 Euphrosyne Komnene Doukaina Palaiologina, daughter of the megas stratopedarches John Synadenos and nun
 Euphrosyne Doukaina Palaiologina, granddaughter of John Synadenos, wife of the protosebastos Constantine Komnenos Palaiologos Raoul
 Euphrosyne Palaiologina Leontarina, daughter of Demetrios Palaiologos Metochites, wife of Demetrios Laskaris Leontares

Sources 
 

Women of the Byzantine Empire